George Wyndham (born 23 March 1990) is a Sierra Leonean para table tennis player. He competed at the 2016 Summer Paralympics. He was the only Sierra Leonean athlete who competed. Wyndham was able to compete with financial help from the United Nations Development Programme.

In the 2016 Summer Paralympics, Wyndham competed in Class 4 of the Men's Table Tennis Individual Event. Wyndham was eliminated from the Tournament in the Preliminary Round of the tournament after coming 3rd in Group F, losing both his matches to Zhang Yan of China (11-2, 11–6, 9–11, 11–5) and to Wanchai Chaiwut of Thailand (11-2, 11–9, 11–9).

Wyndham is paralyzed after suffering from polio as a child.

References

1990 births
Living people
Paralympic competitors for Sierra Leone
Sierra Leonean table tennis players
Sierra Leone Creole people
Table tennis players at the 2016 Summer Paralympics
20th-century Sierra Leonean people
21st-century Sierra Leonean people